McAllister Glacier is in a large cirque to the north and east of Dorado Needle, North Cascades National Park, in the U.S. state of Washington. McAllister Glacier is nearly connected to Inspiration Glacier to the south and the two glaciers are separated by the arête known as Tepeh Towers. Klawatti Peak and an arete extending north from that peak separate McAllister Glacier from the Klawatti Glacier to the east. Like most glaciers in the North Cascades, McAllister Glacier is retreating and retreated approximately 1350 ft (410 m) between 1975 and 2009.

See also
List of glaciers in the United States

References

Glaciers of the North Cascades
Glaciers of Skagit County, Washington
Glaciers of Washington (state)